Stigmatodon belloi, is a species of flowering plant in the family Bromeliaceae. This species is endemic to Brazil.

References

belloi
Flora of Brazil